Joseph T. Cogdal (March 22, 1897 – July 3, 1978) was an American football and basketball coach. He served as the head football at Findlay College—now known as the University of Findlay–in Findlay, Ohio and Illinois State Normal University—now known as Illinois State University—in Normal, Illinois from 1927 to 1930.

After arriving at the university in 1927, he remained until at least the 1960s. He died in 1978.

Head coaching record

Football

References

External links
 

1897 births
1978 deaths
Basketball coaches from Illinois
Findlay Oilers football coaches
Findlay Oilers men's basketball coaches
Illinois State Redbirds football coaches
Illinois State Redbirds men's basketball coaches
Millikin Big Blue men's basketball players
College men's track and field athletes in the United States
People from Atwood, Illinois